And Love Has Vanished is a 1961 Yugoslavian drama film directed by Aleksandar Petrović. It was entered into the 1962 Cannes Film Festival.

Cast
 Beba Lončar - Jovana Zrnić
 Miha Baloh - Mirko
 Miloš Žutić - Dejan
 Borislav Radović
 Nada Kasapić
 Branka Palčić
 Dragan Vladić

References

External links

1961 films
Yugoslav drama films
Serbian drama films
Serbo-Croatian-language films
1961 drama films
Serbian black-and-white films
Yugoslav black-and-white films
Films directed by Aleksandar Petrović
Films set in Yugoslavia